The Gurdwara Sahib of Santa Rosa (also commonly referred to as the Santa Rosa Gurdwara, the Sikh Temple of Santa Rosa, or the North Bay Sikh Foundation) is a center of Sikh worship.

History
The temple was founded in 2002, and according to a 2012 Press Democrat article, has about 100 members. It is a converted modular home located off Todd Road, in a ranching area.

See also
 Gurdwaras in the United States

References

Religious buildings and structures in Sonoma County, California
Santa Rosa
Buildings and structures in Santa Rosa, California
Culture of Santa Rosa, California